Imlil (Berber : ⵉⵎⵍⵉⵍ) is a small village in the high Atlas Mountains of Morocco. A portrait of Imlil and the problems and prospects of Morocco's mountain populations appeared in 1984 in the book by James A. Miller called Imlil and published by Westview Press. It is close to the mountain Jebel Toubkal, the highest peak in Northern Africa. Imlil makes a good base for attempting to summit Toubkal as it lies at the end of the tarmac road, and is a natural place to hire mountain guides and mules for the onward trek.
Imlil is the centre of mountain tourism in Morocco due to its unique position. From here, 90% of visitors head up to Toubkal, the highest mountain in Morocco. 

Imlil is connected to Asni and Ikkiss by road, and shared taxis and mini buses provide services to them both. Asni is the closest town to Imlil and is where the weekly Saturday market is held.  

Imlil as a village is a relatively new creation. It was created to cater for the number of tourists pouring through en route to Toubkal. The original communities still exist in the valleys around Tamatert, Ait Souka, Tagadirt, Tacheddirt, Acheim, Taourirt n'Ait Mizane, Mzikene and Arhrene.

Before the advent of mountain tourism, the Imlil area was well known for its walnuts, apples and cherry production. While these are still important to the local economy, these have been eclipsed by tourism. Both mountain tourists and Moroccans come to Imlil seeking a cool relief from the heat of the Haouz.

The Film 'Seven years in Tibet' was partly filmed in the village.

On 17 December, 2018, two trekkers, from Denmark and Norway, were murdered near to the village by Islamic terrorists who had pledged allegiance to ISIS. At least one victim was beheaded, with the murders videoed and posted to social media

1995 flooding
On 17 August 1995, following  of rainfall in just 2.5 hours, the village of Imlil was catastrophically flooded. A six-metre wall of water washed down the surrounding valleys, with a reported 27 times the average volume of water. Official figures state that up to 150 people, including 20-60 tourists, were killed. Forty vehicles parked near the river were washed away. The villagers experienced significant losses to food stocks and agricultural lands, as well as a depleted tourist industry over the proceeding months. The Moroccan government was quick to help, however, clearing access to the village through the blocked mountain road just four days later. By 2000 the village had still not returned to normal, with large areas of previously cultivated land still buried under flood debris. Many of their walnut trees were also washed away in the flood, each having taken up to 15 years to mature. This loss has still not been accounted for.

Climate

References

External links 
Changing Environments By Susan Bermingham

Mountain villages in Morocco
Populated places in Al Haouz Province